Ghost Town is the fifteenth studio album by the country rock band Poco, released September 20, 1982. The Atlantic Records label debut of Poco, Ghost Town was the final album by Poco to feature the group lineup who had played on Poco's 1978 breakout album Legend, as the 1984 Poco album release Inamorata would not feature Charlie Harrison.

After the gold certified success of the 1978 ABC Records album release Legend, Poco's three subsequent album releases on MCA Records - who had absorbed ABC - failed to reach that level of success. Ghost Town marked Poco's move to Atlantic Records with no resultant comeback peaking at #195 on the album chart in Billboard magazine, well below the peak of the group's final MCA album Cowboys & Englishmen which had been released in February 1982 to reach a chart peak of #131.

The first single from Ghost Town was the title cut which failed to reach the U.S. Billboard Hot 100, "bubbling under" with a peak of #108.  The second single "Shoot for the Moon," while more successful fell short of the Top 40 with a Hot 100 peak of #50 in March 1983. On the Cash Box chart, the song reached #44.  It breached the Top 10 on the U.S. Adult Contemporary chart, peaking at #10.

A third single release: "Break of Hearts" - cited as one of his favorite overlooked compositions by Paul Cotton who's described the song as a follow-up to Poco's 1979 Top 20 hit "Heart of the Night" - failed to chart. Cotton has stated that Poco had problems with Atlantic Records: Poco would record one more album for Atlantic: Inamorata released in April 1984, then take a hiatus from recording until 1989 when the RCA Records release Legacy became Poco's second gold certified album.

Track listing
"Ghost Town" (Rusty Young) – 5:42
"How Will You Feel Tonight" (Paul Cotton) – 3:38
"Shoot For The Moon" (Rusty Young) – 2:48
"The Midnight Rodeo (In The Lead Tonight)" (Paul Cotton) – 2:39
"Cry No More" (Rusty Young) – 3:33
"Break Of Hearts" (Paul Cotton) – 4:28
"Love's So Cruel" (Rusty Young) – 3:02
"Special Care" (Paul Cotton) – 2:42
"When Hearts Collide" (Rusty Young) – 3:33
"High Sierra" (Paul Cotton) – 3:40

Personnel 

Poco
 Kim Bullard – keyboards, Prophet-5, backing vocals
 Paul Cotton – guitars, lead vocals, backing vocals 
 Rusty Young – pedal steel guitar, guitars, lead vocals, backing vocals 
 Charlie Harrison – bass, backing vocals
 Steve Chapman – drums

Additional musicians
 Steve Forman – percussion
 Phil Kenzie – saxophone
 Buell Neidlinger – bass
 Armand Karpoff – cello
 Denise Subotnile – guitar, viola, backing vocals
 Nick DeCaro – string arrangements
 Eddie Karam – conductor 
 Frank DeCaro – contractor
 Harry Bluestone – concertmaster

Production 
 Poco – producers
 John Mills – producer, engineer, mixing
 David Marquette – engineer 
 Don Henderson – assistant engineer 
 Karen Siegel – assistant engineer
 Mike Reese – mastering at The Mastering Lab (Hollywood, California).
 Phil Hartman – cover design 
 Jim Shea – photography

References

Poco albums
1982 albums
Atlantic Records albums